Mohammad Khatami, former President of Iran, announced his candidacy for the 2009 Iranian presidential election on 8 February 2009. Khatami later pulled out of the race.

Campaign events
On 10 February 2009, BARAN foundation claimed anonymous group of Ahmadinejad supporters tried to attack and beat Khatami with stick during annual march of revolution victory. Mohammad Ali Abtahi, close adviser to Khatami confirmed that report.
On 12 February, Hossein Shariatmadari, editor-in-chief of hardliner newspaper Kayhan, wrote a controversial article and threatened Khatami with assassination like former Pakistan popular Premiere Benazir Bhutto.
On 16 March, Khatami officially dropped out of the presidential race in order to endorse Mir-Hossein Mousavi, who he believed would stand a better chance for real reforms against the conservative establishment.
Maziar Bahari of Newsweek magazine reports an unnamed adviser to Khatami told him that Supreme Leader Ali Khamenei "became quite upset" when he heard Khatami had decided to run for president, and "sent a personal message to Khatami asking him to step down." Khatami denied that the Supreme Leader made any such request.

Endorsement
 Families of Iran-Iraq war martyrs including families of:
Air-Force Generals Babaei, 
Air-Force General Sattari
General Bakeri
Former Minister Tondgooyan
General Jahan-Ara
Shiroudi
Ashrafi Esfahani
Labafi-Nejad

See also
2009 Iranian presidential election

References

2009 in Iran
2009 Iranian presidential election
Election campaigns in Iran
Mohammad Khatami